The Wanderer W24 is a middle market car introduced by Auto Union under the Wanderer brand in 1937. The car was powered by a four-cylinder four-stroke engine of 1767 cc driving the rear wheels via a four-speed gear box. Claimed maximum power output of four cylinder Flathead engine was  achieved at 3,400 rpm.

The W24’s structural basis was a box frame chassis. At the back it employed a swing axle arrangement copied from the popular small cars produced by sister brand DKW of Auto Union.

At a time when some of the manufacturer’s larger models featured a twelve-volt electrical system, the W24 still made do with a six-volt arrangement. The car was offered as a four-seater saloon with two or four doors. In addition, approximately 300 cabriolet versions were produced. Seventy years later few of these cabriolet version survive: those that do are much prized by collectors.

By 1940 when the increasing intensity of the war enforced an end to passenger car production, approximately 23,000 Wanderer W24s had been produced. A model belonged to Sisir Kumar Bose, the nephew of Indian nationalist Netaji Subhas Chandra Bose. Subhas Chandra Bose escaped from home arrest riding this car making his way for Germany.

References

W24
Compact cars
Sedans
Auto Union
Rear-wheel-drive vehicles
Cars introduced in 1937
1930s cars